Kristian Matsson (born 30 April 1983) is a Swedish singer-songwriter who performs under the stage name The Tallest Man on Earth. Matsson grew up in Leksand, and began his solo career in 2006, having previously been the lead singer of the indie band Montezumas. His music has often drawn comparisons to the music of Bob Dylan.

Since 2006, Matsson has released five full-length albums and two EPs. He records and produces these in his home, and usually records his voice and guitar together on one track. He is known for his charismatic stage presence.

He was previously married to Amanda Bergman, also known by the stage name Idiot Wind. Together, they wrote the music for the Swedish drama film Once a Year.

Musical career
Before Kristian Matsson began his solo career, he was the lead singer of the indie band Montezumas.

Matsson's first solo release, The Tallest Man on Earth, was released in 2006. The EP received positive reviews.

At the start of his solo career, Matsson didn't plan to make music full-time, and he released his music without providing personal information or photographs of himself to journalists.

To celebrate the 10-year anniversary of The Wild Hunt, Matsson released a cover of Graceland by Paul Simon through Dead Oceans.

Shallow Grave (2008–2009)
In 2008, Matsson released an album, Shallow Grave, which was praised by the music site Pitchfork and was listed #47 on Pitchfork's list of the 50 Best Albums of 2008. The album received generally favorable reviews. Following Shallow Grave's release, Matsson was chosen as the opening act for the American indie folk band Bon Iver. The resulting publicity led to a solo tour throughout the United States, Australia and Europe, where he attracted large crowds, in spite of the lack of a record deal or distribution in the United States.

The song "Pistol Dreams", also released as a single, appeared in the Swedish television serial How Soon Is Now? (Swedish: Upp till kamp).

On 9 October 2009, Matsson visited the Daytrotter studio, where he recorded four songs, including a cover of Bob Dylan's "I Want You." At that time, Matsson cited Roscoe Holcomb as an influence for his singing style and later included Emmylou Harris, Feist and Cat Power as influences.

The Wild Hunt (2010–2012)

Mattson signed with the American label Dead Oceans, and in April 2010 released his second album, The Wild Hunt. The album was well received. The single "King of Spain"  contains, besides the title track, a cover of Paul Simon's "Graceland" and the previously unreleased track "Where  I Thought I Met the Angels"; it was sold exclusively at the subsequent European tour. During the late summer and autumn of 2010 Matsson went on tour in North America and Europe.

The album was followed that same year by an EP, Sometimes the Blues Is Just a Passing Bird, which also got good reviews. The EP was released through the iTunes Store in September, and in November was published on CD, LP and MP3. The album consists of five songs, all written for The Wild Hunt; "Like the Wheel" the conclusion of many of Matsson's gigs, and "The Dreamer", was the first recording on which he plays electric guitar.

The Wild Hunt garnered Matsson several award nominations. In 2011, he was nominated in the category "Best Male Artist" in the Grammis Awards, the Swedish equivalent of the American Grammy Awards, but lost to Håkan Hellström. Matsson was also nominated in the category "pop" in the 2011 P3 Gold Awards, but lost to Malmö indie pop band This Is Head. In February 2011, Matsson won the Manifest Award in the "singer/songwriter" category; he was also nominated in the "live" category, lost to Robyn.

On 5 April 2011, Matsson participated in the BBC's program, Later... with Jools Holland, where he performed the songs "King of Spain" and "Love Is All". In June of the same year, Matsson's debut EP, The Tallest Man on Earth, was reissued with the previously unreleased track "In the Pockets" exclusive to the vinyl edition of the reissue. In July, he released the single "Weather of a Killing Kind" as part of the 2011 Adult Swim Singles program.

In August 2011, Matsson had contributed to the soundtrack of the Swedish drama film En gång om året (English: Once a Year), along with the Idiot Wind. The film premiered at the Gothenburg Film Festival on 29 January 2012 and had a theatrical release on 17 May 2013.

On 27 January 2012, Matsson took part in the Swedish TV game show, På spåret where he, backed by a studio band, performed two cover songs: Thin Lizzy's "Dancing in the Moonlight" and  Cornelis Vreeswijk's "En  Fattig Trubadur" (English: A Poor Troubadour). In February of that year, he re-released "King of Spain" as 12" vinyl for the event Record Store Day. the album was limited to 2000 copies.

There's No Leaving Now (2012–2013)

On 12 June 2012 (June 11 in the UK), Matsson released his third studio album as The Tallest Man on Earth, There's No Leaving Now, on Dead Oceans. The album was recorded by Matsson himself in his home studio in Dalarna during the latter part of 2011 and early 2012. The album was streamed on Dead Oceans' website a week before its official release.

At the same time, Matsson released 1904 b/w Cycles, a 7" LP of his song "1904" as well his cover of the song "Cycles," written by Gayle Caldwell and made famous by Frank Sinatra. He has also covered this song in live performances.

Along with the album, Matsson announced a summer tour throughout Europe and the United States including two gigs in Sweden (at the Södra Teatern (English: Southern Theatre) in Stockholm) and a performance at the Newport Folk Festival in Newport, Rhode Island. Matsson also toured in Europe in October 2012.

On 28 January 2013, Matsson took part in a benefit concert for the American musician Jason Molina, who did not have health insurance and, consequently, was in debt after a hospital stay. The concert took place at the Södra Teatern (English: Southern Theatre) in Stockholm, where Matsson played alongside, among others, I'm Kingfisher and Idiot Wind. Molina died on 16 March 2013.

Dark Bird Is Home (2015)
Matsson's fourth studio album as The Tallest Man on Earth, Dark Bird Is Home, was released on 12 May 2015 on Dead Oceans. The album was largely inspired by Matsson's divorce from Amanda Bergman as well as the death of a close family member, and its more elaborate instrumentation represented a musical shift from previous albums.

Following its release, Matsson performed—with a full band—at several festivals, including the Roskilde Festival in 2015 and the Edmonton Folk Music Festival in 2016.

I Love You. It's a Fever Dream. (2019)
On 4 February 2019, Matsson revealed that a new album would be released in 2019. In late February 2019, he revealed that his new album, now titled I Love You. It's a Fever Dream., would be released sometime in April. He also released the first single, "The Running Styles of New York" the same day. The second single, "I'm a Stranger Now" was released on 27 March. The album was released on April 19 2019.

Matsson's song It Will Follow the Rain from his eponymous EP was featured in a 2019 commercial for the Infiniti QX50 automobile.

Too Late for Edelweiss (2022)
On 19 September 2022, Matsson announced a new album of covers. It was released later that week on 23 September 2022 and includes covers of songs from The National and Bon Iver, among others. The album's title, Too Late for Edelweiss, is a reference to the album För sent för Edelweiss by Swedish singer Håkan Hellström and that titular song is the first cover on the album.

Henry St. (2023)
On 1 february 2023, Matsson revealed that a new album titled Henry St. would be released on 14 april 2023. Henry St. is the first of Mattson's albums recorded an album in a band setting. The announcement of the album was followed by the release of the single "Every Little Heart".

Musical style
Critics have compared The Tallest Man on Earth to Bob Dylan both in terms of songwriting ability and vocal style. When asked about his lyrical style, Matsson explains that he began listening to Bob Dylan at fifteen, and upon hearing Dylan's cover material, he "tried to figure out where those songs came from" and became slowly exposed to early American folk, such as Pete Seeger and Woody Guthrie. But he is careful to qualify this, saying "I don't consider my work to be a part of any tradition. This is how I play. This is how I write songs."

With regard to his guitar technique, Matsson uses a variety of open tunings, and standard tuning to a lesser degree. He had classical guitar training in his youth, but says he "never really focused on it" and that by the end of high school he "got bored playing guitar because it was like math", until he then discovered open tunings while listening to Nick Drake in his early twenties. He was drawn to this style of playing because it allowed him to focus on singing while still performing intricate music.

Discography

Studio albums

EPs
 The Tallest Man on Earth (2006)
 Sometimes the Blues Is Just a Passing Bird (2010)
 A Collaborative EP with yMusic (2017)
 When the Bird Sees the Solid Ground (2018)

Singles

Music videos

References

External links
 
 
 Artist page for The Tallest Man on Earth at NPR Music.
 Review: The Tallest Man on Earth

Swedish folk singers
Swedish folk musicians
Swedish songwriters
English-language singers from Sweden
People from Leksand Municipality
1983 births
Living people
21st-century Swedish singers
21st-century Swedish male singers
Dead Oceans artists
Anti- (record label) artists
21st-century Swedish guitarists
Swedish male guitarists